The Thomas Holland House was a historic residence near Hillsboro, Alabama.  The house was built around 1836 by Thomas Holland, a South Carolinian who had come to Lawrence County, Alabama, in 1823.  Holland began his plantation with 40 acres (16 ha) and built it to over 2100 acres (850 ha) by 1849.  The house was a full two-story dogtrot house constructed of logs, one of the only of its type in Alabama.  The exterior had since been covered in clapboard, and the breezeway had been finished with vertical boards and a chair rail.  Enclosed stairways in each lower room gave access to the upper floor; the central room over the dogtrot was only accessible from the eastern room.  The house was listed on the Alabama Register of Landmarks and Heritage and the National Register of Historic Places in 1991.

The house was destroyed by fire in 1997.

References

National Register of Historic Places in Lawrence County, Alabama
Houses completed in 1836
Dogtrot architecture in Alabama
Log houses in the United States
Houses in Lawrence County, Alabama
Properties on the Alabama Register of Landmarks and Heritage
Log buildings and structures on the National Register of Historic Places in Alabama
1836 establishments in Alabama
1997 disestablishments in Alabama
Buildings and structures demolished in 1997